The Nelson Admirals were a motorcycle speedway team who operated from Seedhill Stadium in Nelson, Lancashire, from 1967 to 1970.

History
Nelson were founder members of British League Division Two in 1968 and finished runners-up in its inaugural season. The following season the team finished 13th. In June 1970, halfway through the season, promoters Les Whaley, Mike Parker and Bill Bridgett moved the British League Division Two side across the Pennines to Bradford.

Season summary

References 

Defunct British speedway teams